"Work Out" is a song by American hip hop recording artist and record producer J. Cole, and released as the lead single from his debut studio album Cole World: The Sideline Story (2011). The song was officially released on June 27, 2011, through Roc Nation and Columbia. Nas voiced his displeasure with the song, which inspired Cole to create the song "Let Nas Down" for his album Born Sinner. It interpolates the chorus from "Straight Up" by Paula Abdul, and samples the ending production of "The New Workout Plan" by Kanye West.

Background 
J. Cole released "Work Out" on June 15, 2011, in honor of the second anniversary of his highly acclaimed mixtape The Warm Up. The song, produced by Cole himself, samples "The New Workout Plan" by Kanye West and interpolates "Straight Up" by Paula Abdul. The song is featured as a bonus track on Cole World: The Sideline Story.

Chart performance 
"Work Out" charted on the U.S. Billboard Hot 100 on the week of July 23, 2011 at number eighty-five. "Work Out" re-entered the Billboard Hot 100 on week of September 24, 2011 at number ninety-eight. The song has since peaked at number thirteen. As of September 2013, the song has sold 1,853,000 downloads in the United States. On May 6, 2013, the single was certified double platinum by the Recording Industry Association of America (RIAA) for sales of over a two million digital copies in the United States.

Charts

Weekly charts

Year-end charts

Certifications

Release history

References

External links
 Official Website

2011 singles
J. Cole songs
Roc Nation singles
Song recordings produced by J. Cole
Songs written by J. Cole
Songs written by Kanye West
Songs written by Elliot Wolff
Songs written by John Legend
2011 songs
Columbia Records singles
Pop-rap songs
Torch songs